P. platyops  may refer to:
 Paramelomys platyops, the lowland mosaic-tailed rat, a rodent species found in Indonesia and Papua New Guinea
 Potorous platyops, the broad-faced potoroo, an extinct marsupial species that once lived in Australia